Samseong Station is a station on Seoul Subway Line 2. It serves the eastern area of Teheranno. Some of the more famous buildings near the station include World Trade Center Seoul, COEX Mall, Korea Electric Power (KEPCO) headquarters, Korea Air City Terminal (buses run from here to Incheon and Gimpo Airports, and vice versa), and Gangnam main police and fire stations. Due to security concerns, the station was closed during the G20 summit and the 2012 Nuclear Security Summit, as this station is directly connected with COEX.

The ridership of this station is very high, consistently ranking among the five most heavily used subway stations in Korea.
The table below shows the average daily ridership between 2010 and 2012.

Although the name of this station shares its pronunciation with the company Samsung, the Hanja for the company (三星) and the station (三成) are different, so there is no relation between the two.

The 836-meter (914-yard) section of sidewalk along Yeongdong Boulevard from exit No.5 of this station, outside COEX Convention & Exhibition Center and ASEM Tower is designated as a smoke-free zone by the Seoul Metropolitan Government.

Station layout

Vicinity
Exit 1: Gangnam Police Station, Park Hyatt Hotel
Exit 2: Russian Embassy of Korea
Exit 3: Hwimoon Middle & High Schools
Exit 4: POSCO Center, Daemyeong Middle School
Exit 5: Korea Air City Terminal, Hyundai Department Store, InterContinental Hotel Grand Seoul Parnas
Exit 6: COEX Mall (direct passageway), World Trade Center Seoul
Exit 7: KEPCO Headquarters
Exit 8: Gangnam Fire Station

References

Seoul Metropolitan Subway stations
Metro stations in Gangnam District
Railway stations opened in 1982
1982 establishments in South Korea
20th-century architecture in South Korea